The 2014 season is Gangwon FC's sixth season in the K League and first ever season in the K League Challenge in South Korea. Gangwon FC is competing in K League Challenge and Korean FA Cup.

Current squad

Out on loan

Transfer

2013–14 Winter

In:

Out:

2014 Summer

In:

Out:

Coaching staff

To 18 September 2014

From 18 September 2014

Match results

K League Challenge

Regular season
All times are Korea Standard Time (KST) – UTC+9

League table

Results summary

Results by round

Relegation/Promotion Playoff

Korean FA Cup

Squad statistics

Appearances
Statistics accurate as of match played 22 November 2014

Goals and assists

Discipline

References

Gangwon FC
2014